The Rima River is a river in the northern part of Nigeria. At its northernmost point it is joined by the Goulbi de Maradi river. It runs southwest and joins the Sokoto River near Sokoto, then continues south to the Niger River. The upper Rima is a seasonal river and flows only during the rainy season.
The Zauro polder project, a major irrigation scheme, has been planned for many years. It would irrigate  of farmland in the Rima floodplain between Argungu and Birnin Kebbi.

References

 
Rivers of Nigeria
Sokoto River